The 2012 season is the 102nd season of competitive football in Paraguay.

Primera División

Transfers

 List of transfers during the 2012 season registered under the Asociación Paraguaya de Fútbol.

National team

Friendly matches

2014 FIFA World Cup qualification

Notes

References
 Paraguay: Fixtures and Results

External links
 Diario ABC Color
 Asociación Paraguaya de Fútbol

 
Seasons in Paraguayan football